The 28th Slavonia Division was a Yugoslav Partisan division that fought against the Germans, Independent State of Croatia (NDH) and Chetniks in occupied Yugoslavia during World War II. 

It was formed in May 1943 on Papuk mountain near Požega in Slavonia. It fought briefly against the 13th Waffen Mountain Division of the SS Handschar (1st Croatian) in eastern Bosnia in late 1944.

References
 
 

Divisions of the Yugoslav Partisans
Military units and formations established in 1943
Military units and formations disestablished in 1945